Chabulina is a genus of moths of the family Crambidae.

Species
Chabulina putrisalis (Viette, 1958)
Chabulina tenera (Butler, 1883)

References

Spilomelinae
Crambidae genera
Taxa named by Eugene G. Munroe